Smog towers or smog free towers (see  below for other names) are structures designed as large-scale air purifiers to reduce air pollution particles (smog).  This approach to the problem of urban air pollution involves air filtration, and removal of suspended mechanical particulates such as soot, and requires energy or power.  Another approach is to remove urban air pollution by a chimney effect in a tall stack, or updraft tower, which may be either filtered or simply released at altitude as with a solar updraft tower, and which may not require operating energy beyond what may be produced by the updraft.

Roosegaarde's smog free tower
The world's first smog free tower was built by Dutch artist Daan Roosegaarde. It was unveiled on September 2015 in Rotterdam and later similar structures were installed in 
Beijing and Tianjin, China; Kraków, Poland; Mexico and Anyang, South Korea. The 7-meter (23 ft) tall tower uses patented positive ionisation technology and is expected to clean 30,000 m3 of air per hour. Below is a gallery of the tower.

Gallery

Towers utilizing other technologies

China

In 2016, a  tower has been built in Xi'an, Shaanxi to tackle the city's pollution. It is under testing by researchers at the Institute of Earth Environment of the Chinese Academy of Sciences.

In Xian, central China, an experimental demonstration urban updraft tower is cleaning the air in a Chinese city with little external energy input.  A 60-metre urban chimney with surrounding solar collector has significantly reduced urban air pollution. This demonstration project was led by Cao Jun Ji, a chemist at the Chinese Academy of Sciences' Key Laboratory of Aerosol Chemistry and Physics. This work has since been published on, with performance data and modelling.

India
, there are at least eight smog towers in India, some of which are smaller in scale:
Connaught Place (around 80 ft; since Aug 2021)
Anand Vihar (around 80 ft)
Lajpat Nagar Central market (20 ft; since Jan 2020)
Gandhi Nagar market (12 ft)
Krishna Nagar market (12 ft)
Bangalore (15 more maybe installed later)
Chandigarh (24-25 m; water used to remove pollutants)
Jaipur

Projects under development
The H14 grade HEPA Filter, known for being able to clean up to 99.99% of the particulate matter, will be used instead, together with a pre-filter and activated carbon. It is claimed the tower will filter air for up to 75,000 people within a  radius. The Kurin City cleaner would be the strongest air purification tower, cleaning more than 32 million cubic metres of air every day.

Criticisms
Some air pollution experts view smog filtration tower projects with scepticism. For example, Alastair Lewis, Professor of Atmospheric Chemistry at the University of York, Science Director at the National Centre for Atmospheric Science, and chair of the Air Quality Expert Group, has argued that static air cleaners, like the prototypes in Beijing and Delhi, cannot process enough city air, quickly enough, to make a meaningful difference to urban pollution. Instead, Lewis argues that "it is far, far easier to come up with technologies and schemes that stop harmful emissions at source, rather than to try to capture the resulting pollution once it's free and in the air". Sunil Dahiya from India's Centre for Research on Energy and Clean Air has commented that "Installing smog towers has never been, and will never be a solution", noting that the Delhi tower would be powered by (mostly) coal-fired electricity, "so we will only be adding to pollution elsewhere in the country".

According to The Times, environmentalists "decried" the Delhi project on the grounds that "given the city's size and the scale of its pollution, 2.5 million smog towers would be needed to clean its air".

See also
 Air-supported structure
 Biofilter
 Domed city
 Green building
 Green wall
 List of tallest buildings and structures
 Sustainable city

Other names
Other names for the structure include:
 anti-smog tower
 smog-filtering tower
 smog-sucking tower
 smog-eating tower
 smog-extracting tower
 smog removal tower
 smog control tower
 smog-alert tower
 air cleaning tower
 air-purifying tower
 air purifier tower
 air purification tower
 ambient air purifier
 pollution control tower
 SALSCS (Solar-assisted Large Scale Cleaning System) 
 HSALSCS (Hybrid Solar-assisted Large Scale Cleaning System)

References

Further reading

 (machine translation, original page in Chinese)

External links
 "Filtration Solutions to Mitigate Coronavirus Aerosol and PM2.5 Pollutants" by Professor David Pui Prof. David Y.H. Pui talked about the smog free towers (SALSCS) in Xi'an and Delhi (video starts from 33:44) 
 IFC Mall installs extra-large air purifiers to manage indoor fine dust (machine translation, original text in Korean)
 Development of Passive/Active integrated module device for fine dust free zone implementation (2nd year) | Bucheon City, Korea's first fine dust reduction device pilot operation (machine translation, original text in Korean) 
 Nutan Labs Smog Towers, Nutan Labs is the producer of the tower in Bangalore
 This device can purify air over 500 sqm
 WAYU air purifiers on Delhi roads turn dustbins, spittoons
 Vast grid of filter towers proposed across Delhi to combat toxic smog
 Studio Symbiosis proposes Aũra towers to alleviate air pollution in Delhi

Air pollution
Building biology
Energy conversion
Filters
Industrial gases
Gas technologies
Scrubbers
Solar power
Sustainable energy